The 2014–15 Minnesota Golden Gophers women's basketball team represented the University of Minnesota in the 2014-15 college basketball season. Led by first year head coach Marlene Stollings for the Golden Gophers, members of the Big Ten Conference, played their home games at Williams Arena in Minneapolis, Minnesota. They finished the season 23–10, 11–7 in Big Ten play to finish in sixth place. They advanced to the quarterfinals of the Big Ten women's tournament where they lost to Ohio State. They received at-large bid of the NCAA women's tournament where they were defeated by DePaul in the first round.

Roster

Schedule and results

|-
! colspan="9" style="text-align: center; background:#800000"|Non conference regular season

|-
! colspan="9" style="text-align: center; background:#800000"|Big Ten regular season

|-
! colspan="9" style="text-align: center; background:#800000"|Big Ten Women's Tournament

|-
! colspan="9" style="text-align: center; background:#800000"|NCAA Women's Tournament

Source

Rankings

See also
2014–15 Minnesota Golden Gophers men's basketball team

References

Minnesota Golden Gophers women's basketball seasons
Minnesota
Minnesota
Minnesota Golden
Minnesota Golden